Beijing Welcomes You is a feature song for the 100-day countdown of the 2008 Summer Olympics held in Beijing, China. The song comprises one hundred famous artists and entertainers from mainland China, Hong Kong, Taiwan, Singapore, Japan and South Korea. Its music video includes a montage of scenes from all over Beijing.  It features the largest contingent of famous artists in a single Chinese-language music video.

The 5 characters in the original Chinese title of the song ("Bei Jing Huan Ying Ni") were used for the names of the "Fuwa" mascots which symbolized the 2008 Summer Olympics: Bei-Bei: fish, Jing-Jing: giant panda, Huan-Huan: the fire, Ying-Ying: gazelle, and Ni-Ni: swallow.

The song runs over six minutes in length. Since its release the song has been extremely popular with the Chinese public.

Artists featured

(in order of appearance)
Chen Tianjia
Liu Huan
Na Ying
Stefanie Sun
Sun Yue
Wang Leehom
Han Hong
Wakin Chau
Gigi Leung 
Yu Quan
Jackie Chan
Richie Jen 
Jolin Tsai
Sun Nan
Bibi Zhou
Wei Wei
Huang Xiaoming
Han Geng
Wang Feng
Karen Mok
Tan Jing
Eason Chan 
Yan Weiwen
Dai Yuqiang
Li Shuangsong
Wang Xia
Liao Changyong
Lin Yilun
Jang Na Ra
JJ Lin
A-do
Joey Yung
Li Yuchun
Huang Dawei
Chen Kun
Nicholas Tse
Han Lei
Vivian Hsu
Fei Xiang
Tang Can
Lin Chi-ling
Zhang Zilin
Jane Zhang
Valen Hsu
Sky Wu
Yang Kun
Christine Fan
You Hongming
Zhou Xiao'ou
Sha Baoliang
Jin Haixin
Peter Ho
F.I.R
Pang Long
Qi Feng
Li Yugang
Kenji Wu
5566
Anson Hu
Yumiko Cheng
Dao Lang
Ji Minjia
Tu Honggang
Denis Ng
Guo Rong
Liu Genghong
Tengger
Jin Sha
Su Xing
Wei Jia
Fu Lishan
Huang Zheng
Jaycee Chan

Locations depicted
The song's music video features the above entertainers appearing in some of Beijing's most renowned sites and locations, as well as the stadiums of the Olympic Green; in order of appearances, some of them are listed below:

Zhengyangmen gate - Chen Tianjia
Beijing National Stadium (Bird's Nest) - Liu Huan
Deshengmen gate - Na Ying
Beihai Park - Stefanie Sun
Pudu Temple - Sun Yue
China Millennium Monument - Leehom Wang
Peking University - Han Hong
Imperial Ancestral Temple (Taimiao) - Wakin Chau
Imperial College (Guozijian) - Gigi Leung
Sections of the Great Wall of China - Jackie Chan
Liulichang - Richie Ren
Shunyi Olympic Rowing-Canoeing Park - Jolin Tsai
National Grand Theatre - Sun Nan
Beijing National Aquatics Center (Water Cube) - Bibi Zhou
Various siheyuans in Beijing - Han Geng, Li Yuchun, David Huang, Chen Kun and many other artists
Beijing Ancient Observatory - Wang Feng
Zhongshan Park - Karen Mok
Temple of Earth - Eason Chan
Beijing Wukesong Culture & Sports Center - Yan Weiwen
Confucius Temple of Beijing - Dai Yuqiang
Shichahai - various artists
Capital Museum - Liao Changyong
Drum Tower and Bell Tower - Jang Nara
Huguang Guild Hall Peking Opera House - JJ Lin & A-Do
Forbidden City - Joey Yung, Nicholas Tse, Yumiko Cheng
Beijing World Trade Center - Vivian Hsu
Meridian Gate - Lin Chiling
Central TV Tower - Peter Ho
Residence of Lao She - Jaycee Chan
Temple of Heaven 
Subway Line 13 train and station
Beijing Capital International Airport, Terminal 2 and Terminal 3
Lotus Flower Market, Houhai
Tian'anmen Square
Nine Dragon Screen

See also
 2008 Summer Olympics Opening Ceremony
 2008 Summer Olympics marketing

References

External links

2008 Summer Olympics
Olympic theme songs
Chinese songs
Mandarin-language songs
All-star recordings
2008 songs